Bellagio may refer to:

 Bellagio, Lombardy, an Italian town near Canzo
 Bellagio (resort), a luxury resort and casino in Las Vegas
 Bellagio (Hong Kong), a private housing building
 Bellagio declaration, an intellectual copyright resolution
 79271 Bellagio, a main-belt asteroid